Nice St-Augustin station (French: Gare de Nice St-Agustin) is a train station on the line from Marseille to Ventimiglia, situated in Nice, in the department of Alpes-Maritimes in the region of Provence-Alpes-Côte d'Azur, France. The station is located close to Nice Côte d'Azur Airport (10 minutes on foot); it is a 5 minute journey from Nice Ville by TER.

History 
The station was moved 400 meters west of its original location on 1 September 2022, to allow connection with lines 2 and 3 of the Nice Tramway, thus providing a direct link to Nice Airport, as well as with bus lines. The new 125m² passenger building is made of wood, with a pergola, and can be completely dismantled. The total cost of the railway station was 19 million euros.

Services 
As of 2022, the station is only served by TER with services eastbound towards Nice, Menton and Ventimiglia, and westbound services towards Cannes, Grasse, Draguignan and Marseille.

Multimodal 
The station is located besides the Nice Tramway Lines 2&3, the latter of which, opening as of late 2019. The Tramway provides direct connections to Nice Airport and into Nice City Centre through tunnelled Tram Operations

See also 

 List of SNCF stations in Provence-Alpes-Côte d'Azur

References 

TER Provence-Alpes-Côte-d'Azur
Railway stations in Alpes-Maritimes
Transport in Nice
Buildings and structures in Nice
Railway stations in France opened in 1864